Phenescaline, or 3,5-dimethoxy-4-phenylethoxyphenethylamine, is a lesser-known psychedelic drug.  It is an analog of mescaline. Phenescaline was first synthesized by Alexander Shulgin. In his book PiHKAL (Phenethylamines i Have Known And Loved), the minimum dosage is listed as 150 mg, and the duration is unknown. Phenescaline produces a threshold effect. Very little data exists about the pharmacological properties, metabolism, and toxicity of phenescaline.

See also 

 Phenethylamine
 Psychedelics, dissociatives and deliriants

References

External links 
 Phenescaline entry in PiHKAL
 Phenescaline  entry in PiHKAL • info

Psychedelic phenethylamines
Phenol ethers